Lake Amadeus (together with Lake Neale, Pitjantjatjara: Pantu ("salt lakes")) is a large salt lake in the southwest corner of  Northern Territory of Australia, about  north of Uluru. The smaller Lake Neale is adjacent to the northwest. It is part of (or a surface feature of) the Amadeus Basin that was filled with the erosion products of the Petermann Orogeny.

Physical features
Due to the aridity of the area, the surface of Lake Amadeus is usually a dry salt crust. In times of sufficient rainfall, it is part of an east-flowing drainage system that eventually connects to the Finke River.

Lake Amadeus contains up to 600 million tonnes of salt; however, harvesting it has not proved viable, owing to its remote location.

History
Lake Amadeus is on Aboriginal land, and is covered by the Katiti and Petermann Aboriginal Land Trusts.

The first European to arrive at the lake, the explorer Ernest Giles, encountered it in 1872. Giles originally intended to honour his benefactor Baron Ferdinand von Mueller with the eponym Lake Ferdinand.  However, Mueller prevailed upon Giles to instead honour King Amadeo I of Spain (reigned 1870–1873, known in English as King Amadeus I), who had previously bestowed honour on him. The lake's expanse proved a barrier for Giles, who could see both Uluru and Kata Tjuta but could not reach them as the dry lake bed was not able to support the weight of his horses.
The next year, William Gosse climbed and named both rises.

Mythology
Legend describes how pantu was created by wanampi (water snake). As described by late Anangu elder Paddy Uluru, "wanampi had dug out the ground with a stick to form a lake, drew concentric circles in the land".

See also

 List of lakes in Australia
 Post-abdication and legacy of Amadeo of Spain
 Tietkens expedition of 1889

References

Amadeus